Washermanpet railway station is one of the railway stations in Chennai, India. It is one of the stations of the Chennai Beach–Gummidipoondi and Chennai Beach-Arakkonam sections of the Chennai Suburban Railway Network. It serves the neighbourhood of Washermanpet, Korukkupet and Tondiarpet. It is situated at Washermanpet, with an elevation of 9 m above sea level. The station lies at the eastern end of the 'diamond' junction of Chennai's railway network, where all the lines of the Chennai Suburban Railway meet.

History

On 9 August 1979, the lines at the station were electrified with the electrification of the Chennai Beach–Basin Bridge section. The lines from Royapuram to Korukkupet were electrified on 26 September 1987.

Facilities

Despite being in the vicinity of important institutions such as Stanley Hospital and RSRM Hospital, the station lacks several basic passenger amenities. There has been a demand for a computerised railway reservation counter at the station. It is also one the stations of the Chennai Metro Rail, which is under construction.

See also

 Chennai Suburban Railway
 Railway stations in Chennai

References

Stations of Chennai Suburban Railway
Railway stations in Chennai